The Clarkson Golden Knights women's ice hockey program represented Clarkson University during the 2013–14 NCAA Division I women's ice hockey season.

One of the most unusual features of the regular season occurred on December 14, 2013, when the Golden Knights competed in an outdoor game against the RIT Tigers at Frontier Field in Rochester, New York. The Golden Knights prevailed by a 6–2 tally.

The Golden Knights finished the regular season by winning the ECAC Hockey regular season championship, the team's first title of any kind. Despite losing the conference tournament in the championship game, the Golden Knights still earned an NCAA tournament bid. In the NCAA tournament, the Golden Knights advanced to the national championship game, where they won their first-ever national championship with a 5–4 triumph over the Minnesota Golden Gophers in the championship game. Of note, it was the first national championship in the history of Clarkson athletics. Also, Clarkson was the first top-level NCAA women's hockey champion from a conference other than the Western Collegiate Hockey Association. In addition to the team successes, Golden Knights senior Jamie Lee Rattray also became the first player in program history to win the Patty Kazmaier Award.

Offseason

Recruiting

Schedule

|-
!colspan=12 style=""| Regular Season

|-
!colspan=12 style=""| ECAC Hockey Tournament

|-
!colspan=12 style=""| NCAA Tournament

Awards and honors

 Erin Ambrose – Patty Kazmaier Memorial Award Top 10, First Team AHCA All-American, First Team All-USCHO.com, ECAC Hockey First Team All-Star, co-ECAC Hockey Best Defensive Defenseman, ECAC Hockey Player of the Week (10/8), ECAC Hockey Preseason All-League Team
 Genevieve Bannon – ECAC Hockey Rookie of the Year finalist, ECAC Hockey Rookie of the Week (12/17, 1/14, 2/17), ECAC Hockey weekly Honor Roll (10/8, 10/15, 11/19, 1/21)
 Renata Fast – NCAA All-Tournament Team
 Vanessa Gagnon – NCAA Elite 89, Sarah Devens Award, Mandi Schwartz Student-Athlete of the Year, ECAC Hockey Best Defensive Forward
 Jessica Gillham – ECAC Hockey weekly Honor Roll (11/12)
 Erica Howe – NCAA All-Tournament Team, Second Team All-USCHO.com, ECAC Hockey Second Team All-Star, ECAC Hockey Goaltender of the Year finalist, ECAC Hockey Goaltender of the Month (November, January, February), ECAC Hockey Goaltender of the Week (10/15, 11/26, 1/14, 2/17), ECAC Hockey weekly Honor Roll (10/8, 10/22, 10/29, 11/5, 11/12, 11/19, 12/10, 12/17, 1/21, 1/26, 2/2), ECAC Hockey Preseason All-League Team
 Corie Jacobson – ECAC Hockey weekly Honor Roll (11/5, 11/26)
 Christine Lambert – ECAC Hockey Player of the Week (11/19)
 Shannon MacAulay – ECAC Hockey All-Tournament Team, ECAC Hockey weekly Honor Roll (2/17)
 Carly Mercer – ECAC Hockey Second Team All-Star, ECAC Hockey Player of the Week (10/15), ECAC Hockey weekly Honor Roll (12/17)
 Jamie Lee Rattray – Patty Kazmaier Memorial Award winner, USCHO.com Player of the Year, NCAA Tournament Most Outstanding Player, NCAA All-Tournament Team, First Team AHCA All-American, First Team All-USCHO.com, ECAC Hockey Player of the Year, ECAC Hockey First Team All-Star, ECAC Hockey Player of the Month (November, December), ECAC Hockey Player of the Week (11/26, 1/26, 2/2), ECAC Hockey weekly Honor Roll (10/29, 11/5, 12/10, 1/14, 1/21), ECAC Hockey Preseason All-League Team
 Brittany Styner – ECAC Hockey Second Team All-Star, ECAC Hockey weekly Honor Roll (2/10)
 Shannon Desrosiers and Matt Desrosiers – USCHO.com Coaches of the Year, ECAC Hockey Coaches of the Year

References

Clarkson
Clarkson Golden Knights women's ice hockey seasons
NCAA women's ice hockey Frozen Four seasons
NCAA women's ice hockey championship seasons
Cla